Kanithan is a 2016 Indian Tamil-language action thriller film written and directed by T. N. Santhosh and produced by S. Thanu. The film stars Atharvaa and Catherine Tresa. Sivamani composed the film's music. Having begun production in 2013, the film was released in February 2016. The film was remade in Kannada as Athiratha (2017) and in Telugu as Arjun Suravaram (2019). It was dubbed in Hindi as the same Title by Goldmines Telefilms on 3 January 2020. It received mixed reviews from critics but was a Hit at box office.

Plot 
Gowtham Ramalingam is an intelligent TV journalist who works in a small channel. For generations, his family has had close links with the media. His father Ramalingam is a news presenter working in Doordarshan. His grandfather was a newsreader in All India Radio. Despite being an academically brilliant engineering graduate, Gowtham prefers working as a TV journalist and yearns to join the BBC. One day, while reporting for his channel, he stumbles across Anu and falls for her. Anu turns out to be his colleague in the same TV channel he is working at and reciprocates his attempts. Gowtham receives an offer letter from BBC, and despite initially struggling, performs well in the interview and gets selected. He is congratulated by his friends at the TV channel office, including Anu. While all goes well, Gowtham suddenly gets arrested on charges of cheating banks (to the tune of several lakhs) of rupees by producing fake documents and degree certificates. Gowtham's degree certificates, along with those of the other affected students, get invalidated. While he is being taken to prison, a fellow graduate seated beside him commits suicide by falling off the police van and getting run over by a truck. Gowtham realizes that he (along with the other graduates) have been made a pawn in a huge scam. His neighbour who works in the police department and his friend Balaji, a lawyer, Senthil, his friend and colleague and Anu manage to get him out of prison. Gowtham's job at BBC gets rejected due to his certificate being labelled as forged. Gowtham then decides to infiltrate and expose the fake certificate scam with the help of his neighbour, Balaji, Senthil and Anu.

Gowtham recalls the scene at the police station about the fake documents, that were used to obtain loans from the banks; they carried the same photograph as the one present in his degree certificate. He deduces that he had used the certificate in a consultancy firm in Anna Nagar. When he, his neighbour, Senthil, and Balaji reach the place to find it locked, they break the lock and get inside. They search for the fake degree certificate in his name and find out that all the fake degree certificates, in the blueprints of Anna University, University of Madras, Madras Christian College, and several other major universities, are hidden in the ceiling. Gowtham and his team confiscate the fake certificates and convey a message to other TV channels, including his own channel, to list out the names of the fake degree certificate holders on-air. The consultancy firms are closed down, and it worries Thura Sarkar, the kingpin in the fake certificate scam, and his sons. While airing the news, he intentionally puts Balaji's name in the certificates(in-order to nab Thura, knowing that his name is not the list), Gowtham's plan works and manages to save Balaji just in time, fights and kill all of the goons,including Thura's son. He even hid the camera in the crime spot, knowing Thura would come there to find other evidence. However, Thura finds the hidden camera and almosts executed Gowtham, but with the help of Gowtham's neighbour they successfully escape. Gowtham infiltrates and records the scammers in his mobile phone while posing as an applicant for a fake certificate, on the other side, Thura starts looking for people who were responsible for spreading the news and manages to track the right guy. This news is spread further, and Thura's plans are thwarted. He reaches Gowtham's office and holds Senthil and the others hostage; Gowtham calls him on his phone and saves Senthil by revealing his whereabouts. Anu gets kidnapped by Thura's son and his gang when Gowtham overpowers and kills Thura's second son.

Thura then decides to seek revenge by brutally murdering Balaji and Gowtham's neighbour. Gowtham becomes infuriated at this and decides to end this once and for all. He sends one of his colleagues in the guise of a fake certificate applicant to Thura's place while recording the events via microcamera-enabled spectacles. Gowtham and Senthil then broadcast the entire video on-air. Thura reaches the channel office, fights Gowtham, and destroys the transmission terminal. However, the transmission gets re-enabled, and the video goes on-air. Gowtham lands a kick at Thura, causing him to hit his head on screws in the destroyed terminal and fall unconscious. The scam is finally exposed. Gowtham is lauded for his efforts and reunites with Anu and others. Meanwhile, Thura is in a vegetative state and is placed under tight police security in due apprehension for his crimes once he is cured. The lead doctor advises his assistant to monitor Thura's state. The assistant doctor turns out to be a fake; he unknowingly injects the wrong medicine in Thura's glucose stream, and his pulse begins to deteriorate. The lead doctor scolds the assistant by asking whether he became a doctor by submitting a fake certificate, while Thura dies which shows an irony of how a fake certificate holder that he helped becomes his ultimate downfall.

Cast 

 Atharvaa as Gowtham Ramalingam, a TV journalist
 Catherine Tresa as Anu, Gowtham's colleague and love interest
 Tarun Arora as Thura Sarkar, the fake certificate scam kingpin
 Aadukalam Naren as Ramalingam, Gowtham's father
 Manobala as Madhan, Anu's father and head of the TV channel where Gowtham works
 Karunakaran as Lawyer Balaji, Gowtham's friend
 Sunder Ramu as Senthil, Gowtham's colleague
 K. Bhagyaraj as Gowtham's neighbour
 Ashwin Raja as Thirupathi
 Anil Murali as Inspector Jerald
 Y. G. Mahendra
 R. S. Shivaji as Lawyer
 Sai Dheena as Bhai
 Nanjil Vijayan as Salim
 Aadhira
 Mathew Varghese as BBC journalist

Production 
The project materialised in October 2013, with producer S Thanu revealing that Atharvaa and Catherine Tresa were signed on by his production house to feature in a film directed by T.N. Santhosh, an erstwhile assistant of A.R. Murugadoss. The film will have music by Sivamani of Arima Nambi fame and camera work by ace cinematographer, Arvind Krishna. The shoot began progressing in December 2013, with a first look poster being revealed the following month. In April 2014, it was reported that Jackie Shroff plays the villain in the film, though he was later replaced by Tarun Arora.

Soundtrack 

Music has been composed by Sivamani. And there are total five songs in this film.

Reception 
Behindwoods wrote, "What could have been an intelligent crackerjack suspense entertainer ends up being a medially engaging product due to few lacklustre moments and some sluggish screenplay in the second half. Despite its flaws, this savvy thriller is worth watching once mainly for some exhilarating action sequences, Atharvaa’s top class performance and a few adrenaline-pumping moments." Hindustan Times wrote "Like so many Tamil films, Kanithan begins with a fantastic idea and story, but Santosh lets these spin out of control -- till the script sinks beyond salvation." Rediff wrote, "Despite the compelling plot, Kanithan is an uninspired action thriller that has little to offer." Times of India wrote "Kanithan feels less than the sum of its parts. The chief reason is the scenes that act as a filler between the action, which are either banal or overlong or both. The film takes a while to get going and almost the first 30 minutes are wasted through clichéd scenes in the name of setting up the hero's character and his romance." Sify wrote "Overall, Kanithan tries hard to satisfy multiple agendas that telling an interesting story becomes secondary to everything else". Silverscreen wrote, "Kanithan is ambitious in scope and inept in execution." Baradwaj Rangan of The Hindu wrote, ".. we see an increasingly tense cat-and-mouse game between well-matched (and brainy) adversaries. Kanithan is a two-sided procedural...there are some tense moments. The editor (Bhuvan Srinivasan) really goes for the jugular."

References

External links 
 

2016 films
2010s Tamil-language films
2016 action thriller films
2016 crime action films
2016 crime thriller films
Films about the mass media in India
Action films based on actual events
Journalism adapted into films
Films about journalists
Films about organised crime in India
Films about security and surveillance
Thriller films based on actual events
Indian action thriller films
Indian crime action films
Indian crime thriller films
Films about corruption in India
Fictional portrayals of the Tamil Nadu Police
Films shot in Madurai
Films shot in Chennai
Films shot in Tiruchirappalli
Films set in Tiruchirappalli
Films set in Chennai
Films about fraud
Tamil films remade in other languages
2016 directorial debut films